Harga (also known as "La Brûlure") is a 2010 documentary film.

The film has been shown at a Festival of World Films in Montreal in 2010 and at a Festival de la Citoyenneté in Tunis in 2011.

Synopsis 
Hichem has dreamt with "harga" since he was a child. One day he set forth on the sea towards Europe, on the grand forbidden voyage in a precarious open boat with 27 other Tunisians, some of whom were his friends. Hichem is the only one who has come back. Other Tunisians tell us why they want to leave their country: Poverty, unemployment, no hope for the future, trapped in a dead end. They are ready to do anything to improve their situation, and that includes risking their lives.

References

External links 

2010 films
French short documentary films
Tunisian documentary films
2010 short documentary films
Documentary films about refugees
2010s French films